Epoxide hydrase may refer to:
 Microsomal epoxide hydrolase
 Soluble epoxide hydrolase 
 Epoxide hydrolase